Michele Niccolai is a sculptor born in Livorno. He spent his youth in Cecina. He learned to sculpt and fire clay using his garndfather's furnace.

Career
During his time at university he worked with the master sculptor Alberto Mainardi. After graduating in architecture, he learned from the ceramist Gabriella Zazzeri the Japanese Raku ware technique.

For over 35 years, he has been teaching at the Leon Battisti Alberti high school in Florence.

Examples of his art are Processo a Pigmalione (2005) in the Museo degli Innocenti Firenze, (2009) I Baccanali in the Auditorium of the Duomo of Firenze. In 2013 he was the subject of a solo exhibition celebrating his fifty-year career as a sculptor at the palazzo Panciatichi seat of Consiglio regionale della Toscana.

Critics Maria Giovanna Carli and Maria Carla Caccialupi have written about his sculptural art.

Sculpturing
 Exhibition  1973 – 2003 Andata e ritorno, Cecina, 2003.
 Exhibition  Processo a Pigmalione Museo degli Innocenti Firenze, 2005.
 Group Exhibition Floating Art in Lungarno Ferrucci Firenze, 2005
 Group Exhibition Il Cavallo di De Chirico Collettiva Palazzo del Pegaso, 2006
 Exhibition I Baccanali Auditorium del Duomo di Firenze, 2009.
 Solo Exhibition at Consiglio Regionale della Toscana Palazzo del Pegaso Firenze, 2013.
 Exhibition L'armonia del bello" in Chiostro di San Marco in Firenze in 2016.
 Exhibition Painting and sculpture with Roberto Greco in Colle Val d'Elsa in 2017.

Works in public spaces and other projects
 2013 – The Sculpture La speranza d'oro Gallery of the Regional Council of Tuscany

Awards and honors
The Sculpture La speranza d'oro is the logo of The Premio Impresa Innovazione Lavoro del Consiglio Regionale della Toscana.

Biography reading

References

External links
 http://www.stamptoscana.it/articolo/cultura/le-mostre-di-stamp-le-forme-e-i-miti-di-niccolai?lang=en
 http://www.toscanamedianews.it/itinerari-artistici-in-consiglio-regionale.htm
 http://www.gonews.it/2016/10/17/grande-successo-le-nove-mostre-ideate-curate-giovanna-carli/
 http://ecodelmontepadule.com/2016/10/larte-butese-non-conosce-confini-lori-scarpellini-espone-a-siena-chiostro-del-carmine-inaugurazione-sabato-15-ottobre/
 https://enotriaonwine.wordpress.com/2009/09/08/bentornati/

1953 births
Living people
20th-century Italian sculptors
20th-century Italian male artists
21st-century Italian sculptors
Italian male sculptors
People from Livorno
Postmodern artists
21st-century Italian male artists